The Men's omnium competition at the 2017 World Championships will be held on 15 April 2017.

Results

Scratch race

40 laps (10 km) were raced.

Tempo race
36 sprints were held, each awarding a point to the winner; in addition, 20 points were added/subtracted for a lap gain/loss respectively.

Elimination race
Sprints were held every two laps; the last rider in each sprint was eliminated.

Points race and final standings
Riders' points from the previous 3 events were carried into the points race (consisting of 100 laps (25km)), in which the final standings were decided.

References

Men's omnium
UCI Track Cycling World Championships – Men's omnium